Luiz Alberto may refer to:

 Luiz Alberto (footballer, born 1977), Luiz Alberto da Silva Oliveira, Brazilian football centre-back
 Luiz Alberto (footballer, born 1982), Luiz Alberto Leite Sousa, Brazilian football centre-back

See also
 Luis Alberto (disambiguation)